Stanislav Jarábek  (born 9 December 1938) is a former Slovak football player who played for FC Spartak Trnava. He played for Czechoslovakia on 1968 Summer Olympics in Mexico. He is the father of Juraj Jarábek.

References

External links
 
 
 
 
 

1938 births
Living people
People from Trnava District
Sportspeople from the Trnava Region
Czechoslovak footballers
Slovak footballers
FC Spartak Trnava players
Czechoslovak First League players
Olympic footballers of Czechoslovakia
Footballers at the 1968 Summer Olympics
Czechoslovak football managers
Slovak football managers
FC Baník Ostrava managers
FC Spartak Trnava managers
FK Dukla Banská Bystrica managers
ŠK Slovan Bratislava managers
FC Nitra managers
Association football central defenders
MFK Vítkovice players
Slovak Super Liga managers